Jean Hillier is Professor Emerita in the Centre for Urban Research at RMIT University, Melbourne, Australia.

Research interests 
Research interests include poststructural planning theory and methodology for strategic practice in conditions of uncertainty, more-than-human planning theory and practice, and problematisation of cultural heritage practices in spatial planning, particularly in China.

Research projects 
 ARC Large Grant. The Role of Procedural Justice in Determining the Effectiveness of Citizen Involvement in Planning.  
 AHURI. Falling through the Net, A Risk Management Model for Home Ownership Support Schemes. (with Peter V., Walker R. & Berry M.)
 AHURI. The Impact of Urban Regeneration on Indigenous Households. (with Walker R.)
 EU FP6. Katarsis. (with Moulaert F.). 
 EU FP7. Social Polis. (with Moulaert F.)  
 ARC Discovery. Enabling social innovation for local climate adaptability (with Steele W., MacCallum D., Byrne J. and Houston D.)

Publications 
Over 200 publications in her name:

Books 
2002 * Habitus: A Sense of Place, edited with Emma Rooksby, Ashgate, Aldershot

2002 * Shadows of Power: an Allegory of Prudence, Routledge, London.

2005 * Consent and Consensus, edited with Denis Cryle, API Network, Perth.

2007 * Stretching Beyond the Horizon: a multiplanar theory of spatial planning and governance, Ashgate, Aldershot.

2008 * Critical Essays in Planning Theory, 3 Volumes, edited with Patsy Healey, Ashgate, Aldershot.

2009 * Social Innovation and Territorial Development, edited with Frank Moulaert, Serena Vicari and Diana MacCallum, Ashgate, Aldershot.

2009 *	Planning in 10 Words – Or Less, with Gunder M., Ashgate, Farnham.

2010 *	The Ashgate Research Companion to Planning Theory: Conceptual Challenges for Spatial Planning, edited with Patsy Healey, Ashgate, Farnham.

2012 *	Complexity and the Planning of the Built Environment, edited with Gert de Roo, Joris Van Wezemael, Ashgate, Farnham.

2014 *	Gilles Deleuze and Félix Guattari for Planners, InPlanning e-book,  

2015 *	Connections: exploring contemporary planning theory and practice with Patsy Healey, edited with Jonathan Metzger, Ashgate, Farnham.

2017 *	The Planning Theory Tradition: an international account, 规划理论传统：国际化解读, with Patsy Healey, Southeastern University Press, Nanjing, China 南京东南大学出版社有限公司 (In Mandarin).

2017 *	Situated Practices of Strategic Planning: An international perspective, edited with Louis Albrechts and Alessandro Balducci, Routledge, Abingdon.

Selected journal articles 
2020 * Towns within Towns: From incompossibility to inclusive disjunction in urban spatial planning, (with Metzger J.) Deleuze and Guattari Studies

References

1953 births
Living people
Alumni of Bedford College, London
Academics of Newcastle University